Langeron is a commune in central France. People with the surname of Langeron include:

Louis Alexandre Andrault de Langeron (1763–1831), French general in the Imperial Russian Army during the Napoleonic Wars
Maurice Langeron (1874–1950), French mycologist, bryologist, and paleobotanist
Teodor Andrault de Langeron ( 19th century), Russian official in Congress Poland; President of Warsaw

See also
Cape Langeron, Ukrainian promontory extending into the Gulf of Odessa